Soem Ngam is a district (amphoe) in the western part of Lampang province, northern Thailand.

Geography
Neighboring districts are (from the northeast clockwise): Hang Chat, Ko Kha, Sop Prap, Thoen of Lampang Province, Thung Hua Chang and Mae Tha of Lamphun province.

The Khun Tan Range stretches from north to south along the district.

History
Soem Ngam was established as a minor district (king amphoe) on 16 August 1971 by splitting off tambons Thung Ngam, Soem Khwa, and Soem Sai from Ko Ka District. The minor district was upgraded to a full district on 21 August 1975.

Administration
The district is divided into four subdistricts (tambons), which are further subdivided into 42 villages (mubans). Soem Ngam is a subdistrict municipality (thesaban tambon) which covers parts of tambons Thung Ngam, Soem Sai, and Soem Klang. There are a further four tambon administrative organizations (TAO).

Resources

External links
amphoe.com

Soem Ngam